Jack of the Red Hearts is an American film directed by Janet Grillo and centered on the issues of orphanage, family, autism, exclusion and inclusion. The film premiered on May 6, 2015 at the Bentonville Film Festival and released theatrically on February 26, 2016.

Plot 
18-year-old Jack struggles to take care of her younger sister, Coke, as both are orphans. When Coke is taken into social assistance services, Jack is required to find a stable income in order to gain legal custody of her sister. After taking the resume of an actual therapist, Donna and assuming her identity, Jack is hired by Kay and Mark to care for their daughter, a young autistic girl named Glory, who is about Coke's age. While Jack finds her job challenging at first, she eventually improves and creates a positive connection with Glory. After the forgery is discovered by Robert (Israel Broussard), Jack realizes her wrongdoing. She helps the family and gets Glory admission to a school. She goes to meet her sister and tell her that she should stay in the foster home. The family then forgives her and promises to do anything they can for Jack. At the end of the movie, we can see Jack as she contemplates the sky the same way as Glory, while being driven in a police car.

Cast 
AnnaSophia Robb as Jacqueline "Jack" Ferguson, an eighteen-year-old runaway
Famke Janssen as Kay Adams, Robert and Glory's mother
Scott Cohen as Mark Adams, Robert and Glory's father
Israel Broussard as Robert Adams, Glory's seventeen-year-old brother and Jack's love interest
Taylor Richardson as Glory Adams, an eleven-year-old autistic girl
Sophia Anne Caruso as Bethany "Coke" Ferguson, Jack's eleven-year-old sister
Maria Rivera as Daisy, Jack's best friend
John D'Leo as Dudley, Robert's best friend
 Omar Maskati as Junior

Reception 
Jack of the Red Hearts has grossed a total worldwide of $31,126. On review aggregator website Rotten Tomatoes, the film holds an approval rating of 55% based on 11 reviews, and an average rating of 5.9/10. On Metacritic, the film has a weighted average score of 55 out of 100, based on 5 critics, indicating "mixed or average reviews". The film won the jury award for best film at the first Bentonville Film Festival in 2015, the Audience Award for the Best Narrative Feature, the Jury Award for the Best Feature Narrative and the Director Prize for Best Young Actress (for Taylor Richardson's performance as a severely autistic child) at Woods Hole Film Festival 2015, and The Chimaera Project Award at the Catalina Film Festival 2015.

References

External links
 
 

2015 films
Films about autism
Films about orphans
2015 drama films
2010s English-language films